My Life for Ireland is a Nazi propaganda movie from 1941 directed by Max W. Kimmich, telling a story of an Irish nationalist family and their involvement in the Irish struggle of independence over two generations. The movie was produced for Nazi-occupied Europe with the intent of challenging pro-British allegiances; yet in some cases it had the unintended effect of making audiences identify the Irish struggle with their own resistance against the Nazis.

The film's sets were designed by the art directors Wilhelm Depenau and Otto Erdmann.

Plot 
The film covers the story of two generations of an Irish nationalist family; starting with Michael O'Brien (Werner Hinz) and following with his son, also Michael (Will Quadflieg), eighteen years later in 1921.

The film commences in Dublin in 1903. A squad of police officers break into a thatched hovel and evict the family, throwing a young child to the floor. However they are ambushed by a group of Irish nationalists and a long fire fight ensues.  Michael O'Brien is captured and is sentenced to death. While he is in prison, his pregnant fiancée Maeve visits him and they are secretly married. Afterwards, Michael hands his wife a silver cross that will always be worn by the best Irish freedom fighter. On the cross, the words My life for Ireland are engraved.

Eighteen years later, in 1921, his son Michael Jr. is expecting to pass his school leaving exams. As the son of an infamous Irish nationalist, he has been educated at St Edwards College, a school run by British teachers. In this way the British government attempt to re-educate Irish pupils into "worthy" British citizens.

Cast 
Anna Dammann, Maeve Fleming 
René Deltgen, Robert Devoy 
Paul Wegener, Sir George Beverley 
Werner Hinz, Michael O'Brien Senior 
Will Quadflieg, Michael O'Brien Junior 
Heinz Ohlsen, Patrick O'Connor 
Eugen Klöpfer, Duffy 
Hans Bergmann, captain of the 'Black and Tans'
Claus Clausen, Patrick Pollock 
Will Dohm, Barrington (teacher) 
Karl John, Raymond Davitt
Hans Quest, Henry Beverley
Wilhelm Borchert, Thomas O'Neill 
Jack Trevor as the president of the martial court
Charles John, Raymond Davitt

Propaganda
This film contributed to the era of anti-British films made by Nazi Germany. In this film, as in Der Fuchs von Glenarvon, the British are depicted as brutal and unscrupulous but no match for the "earthy" Irish race.  A British officer, for instance, abandons an Irish sergeant on the battlefield, taking the last water bottle with him, and is later shown winning a VC. It lacks, however, the cruder propaganda of later films, such as Carl Peters and Ohm Krüger, when Hitler had given up hope of making peace with Great Britain. The anti-British atmosphere of Der Fuchs von Glenarvon, for example, can be judged from its opening sequence, which depicts a meeting of Irish revolutionaries:ASSEMBLY: We must build new roadsLEADER: With what shall we build new roads?ASSEMBLY: With the bones of our enemy!LEADER: And who is our enemy?ASSEMBLY: England!

Some German viewers in ethnically mixed areas expressed fears that it would stimulate Poles to rebellion. The film, however, enjoyed a positive response from many audiences.

References

External links

Nazi propaganda films
Films of Nazi Germany
German historical films
1941 films
Films set in Dublin (city)
Films set in 1903
Films set in 1921
1940s historical films
Films directed by Max W. Kimmich
Tobis Film films
German black-and-white films